The Tejano Music Award for Album of the Year – Conjunto (formerly the Tejano Music Award for Album of the Year – Conjunto/Traditional from the 11th and 12th awards ceremony) is an honor presented annually by the Texas Talent Musicians Association (TTMA). Musicians nominated for this category are performers of the conjunto style of Tejano music.

Current holder, the Hometown Boys are tied with David Lee Garza for most wins at five. While Elida Reyna remains the only female musician to have won the award, Linda Escobar has been the most nominated female singer with three nominations.

Recipients

Album of the Year – Overall

References

External links
Official site of the Tejano Music Awards

Album of the Year - Conjuto
Awards established in 1981
Awards disestablished in 2015
Album awards